Bits & Pretzels is a three-day conference for founders and enthusiasts from the start-up scene, which takes place in Munich, Bavaria, Germany, during the Oktoberfest. So far, speakers included international and national founders and investors, among them the founders of Virgin, Airbnb, Lottoland, Shazam, Tinder, Zendesk and Evernote. The goal of the event is inspiration through lectures and the networking of the participants among each other.

History 
September 2014 the first founder event took place as a breakfast, which was founded by Andreas Bruckschlögl and Bernd Storm. Since January 2015, Felix Haas joined the team as the third co-host and since then the event is organized as "Bits & Pretzels". In May 2019, Britta Weddeling, formerly from Handelsblatt, joined as "Editor-in-Chief".

At the first event in September 2014, 1,400 participants came together in the ballroom of the Löwenbraukeller in Munich. Among the first speakers were the founders of Qype, mydealz, Stylight, and XING and various start-up pitches took place. Ilse Aigner, who is also the patron of the event, led a panel discussion on current political topics. The proceeds from the event were donated to the Munich Tafel.

The second Bits & Pretzels took place on 16 January 2015. This event already drew 1,800 participants. In addition to national speakers, international speakers were also present this time. Philip Inghelbrecht and Avery Wang gave a talk about SHAZAM! and talked about their initial problems. Other speakers included Jonathan Badeen from Tinder and Ray Chan from 9GAG.

The third Bits & Pretzels with around 3,500 participants took place from 27 to 29 September 2015. Instead of it being a breakfast, this event was planned as a three-day festival for the first time. The last day of the conference ended in the Schottenhamel tent at the Oktoberfest. The speakers included, among others, the CEO of Adidas Herbert Hainer or Niklas Östberg, CEO of Delivery Hero.

From 25 to 27 September 2016, over 5000 participants came together for 4th Bits & Pretzels. As in the previous year, the first two days took place at the International Congress Center of Messe München and the last day at the Oktoberfest. Speakers included the British entrepreneur Richard Branson, the American actor Kevin Spacey, the founder of Airbnb Nathan Blecharczyk, CEO of the Mozilla Foundation as well as the investors of the TV show Die Höhle der Löwen.

From 24 to 26 September 2017, another 5,000 participants came together in Munich, after the number of participants for this event was capped. The speakers at the 2017 event included Stefan Raab, the former World (Soccer) Players of the Year Philipp Lahm, and Oliver Kahn, the Dutch actress Carice van Houten (famous for her role in Game of Thrones) and the CEOs of adidas, Infineon and E.ON.

For the event in 2018, the satirist and television presenter Jan Böhmermann, the former F1 world champion Nico Rosberg, the founder of the #MeToo movement Tarana Burke, as well as the CEOs of Vodafone Germany, Volocopter and FlixMobility have already been confirmed.

Schedule 
At Bits & Pretzels, founders of national and international companies tell their success story and give tips. Keynotes, workshops, panel discussions, masterclasses, and a start-up competition are scheduled for the first two days of the conference at the International Congress Center in Munich. The speakers on the main stage wear Bavarian costume to combine Bavarian tradition with innovation. The third day of the event is all about networking, so once again all the participants come together at the Oktoberfest. Following the "Table Captain" principle, the young founders and investors network over beer and chicken in the packed Oktoberfest tent.

In 2017, "Topic Tables" revolving around one specific topic were introduced for the first time. With a Corporate Innovation stage and an Investor's stage, new areas of focus have been set in 2017. The topic of "matchmaking, was strengthened on site with a specially designated area to facilitate networking among the participants. In addition to industry-related content, an entertainment program with comedians and bands provided some diversion. In 2015, the Bavarian Comedian Harry G was on stage, and in 2016, the German band Sportfreunde Stiller gave a concert. In 2017, the band Moop Mama played in the Oktoberfest tent as a surprise. Previously implemented on a small scale, in 2017 the Bits & Pretzels Start-up Night, during which even non-Bits & Pretzels-participants were able to attend evening events all over Munich took place for the first time.

Speakers (selection) 
At the event, national as well as international speakers form start-ups, international companies and large DAX companies give speeches.

Table Captains (selection) 
The Table Captains are representatives from the fields of media, economics, or education, tasked with stimulating discussions at their assigned tables on the third day of Bits & Pretzels at the Oktoberfest. According to the "first-come, first-served" principle, participants can select in advance which table captain they would like to share the table with.

External links 

Official Website

References 

September events
Oktoberfest
Recurring events established in 2014